The State University of New York at Delhi (SUNY Delhi or Delhi State College) is a public college in Delhi, New York.  It is part of the State University of New York (SUNY) system. Over 3,000 students attend the institution.  

SUNY Delhi offers over 60 programs, which can lead to certificates, associate degrees, bachelor's degrees, or master’s degrees. There are five academic schools within the college: Veterinary and Applied Sciences, Applied Technologies, Business and Hospitality Management, Nursing, and Liberal Arts and Sciences. The college is accredited by the Middle States Commission on Higher Education.

Delhi’s intercollegiate athletic teams compete in NCAA Division III and the North Atlantic Conference, and the mascot is Blaze, the Bronco.

History

SUNY Delhi was founded in 1913 as a small agriculture school by two women, Amelia & Elizabeth MacDonald. Then known as the State School of Agriculture & Domestic Science, the college served students from all over New York. In the late 1920s the college began offering more general education and added dormitory buildings. It was not until the 1960s that the institution expanded by offering more programs of study like business, refrigeration, construction, and veterinary technology. Delhi added several new academic buildings, more dorms, and a new dining hall.
 
The college began offering bachelor's degrees in the early 2000s, and the physical campus expanded. The athletic program joined the NCAA Division III in 2018. The college now offers two master's degrees.

Academics
SUNY Delhi currently offers over 60 programs of study, including several one-year certificate programs,  46 two-year associate degrees, 20 bachelor’s degrees, and two master’s degrees. Nine online degrees offered include one associate degree, six bachelor’s degrees, and two master’s degrees.  Degree types offered include certificates which cover the industry basics for several trade-based programs (in areas like automotive mechanics, cabinet making, plumbing, heating, refrigeration, and more), Associate of Occupational Studies (AOS), Associate of Applied Sciences (AAS), Associate of Arts (AA), Associate of Science (AS), Bachelor of Business Administration (BBA), Bachelor of Technology (BT), Bachelor of Science (BS), Bachelor of Science in Nursing (BSN), and Master of Science in Nursing (MSN).

Online Programs   
SUNY Delhi offers several degrees with options for virtual study in associate, bachelor’s and master’s degrees. Current online offerings include an AOS in Electrical Construction and Instrumentation (IBEW), bachelor’s degrees in Criminal Justice, Culinary Arts Management, Event Management, Hotel & Restaurant Management, Business and Technology Management and RN-to-BSN Nursing. The college’s two master’s degrees are offered online and are degrees in Nursing Administration or Nursing Education.  

Based on a recent study by Intelligent.com, SUNY Delhi is among the nation’s top-ranked institutions in 2020, offering the best online bachelor’s programs in Hospitality Management, Criminal Justice, and Nursing RN-to-BSN. In the study, accredited programs were compared and ranked based on their reputation in their fields, course strength, flexibility, and cost.

Culinary Arts Program
SUNY Delhi's culinary team won the American Culinary Federation’s New York State Student Team Championship in 2000, 01, 02, 03, 04, 05, 06, 07, 08, 2010, and 2012 the eighth year for Delhi to earn this title in the last 10 years. They have also won the ACF's Northeast Region Student Team Championship   in  2001, 03, 07, 08, 2010 and 2012. In 2010 SUNY Delhi's culinary team was the first team from New York State to win the ACF's National Student Team Championship. The school won the National Championship again in 2012.

Student life

Residence halls
There are many options for living on the SUNY Delhi campus, as well as within the town itself. Russell Hall is the largest dorm on the main campus. It has single, double, and a few co-ed housing occupancy rooms, holding nearly 500 students. Gerry Hall and Dubois Hall, also on the main campus, consist only of double occupancy size rooms, while Murphy Hall and O'Connor Hall are made up of triple occupancy rooms. Catskill Hall, on the main campus, consists of suites containing two double rooms and two single rooms, a shower room and bathroom, and a living room area. Off the main campus, Riverview Town Houses, intended for upperclassmen, consist of separate two-story houses with four double rooms, a kitchen, a living-room, and three bathrooms. Laundry facilities are available regardless of the students' campus housing. Student positions are available for Resident Assistants and Night Hosts.

Clubs and activities
There are over forty clubs and organizations on campus, as well as sixteen recognized and several unrecognized Greek organizations. The student activities office is located in the upper level of the Farrell Student and Community Center.

Student Senate
The student senate meets every Wednesday at 5:15 sharp in the Farrell Student and Community Center room 211/212. Although each club or organization on campus is represented with an elected senator, any student is welcome to come to the senate meetings and voice their interest. The student senate office is located in the bottom, club office portion of Farrell, in room 32. If the officers are out of the office, further interest can be addressed in the student activities office, also located in the Farrell Student and Community Center.

Athletics
The SUNY Delhi athletic teams are called the Broncos. The college is a member of the Division III level of the National Collegiate Athletic Association (NCAA), primarily competing in the North Atlantic Conference (NAC) since the 2019–20 academic year. They also competed as a member of the United States Collegiate Athletic Association (USCAA) from 2015–16 to about 2019–20. The Broncos previously competed in the short-lived D-III American Collegiate Athletic Association (NCAA) from 2017–18 to 2018–19; as an NAIA Independent within the Association of Independent Institutions (AII) from 2008–09 to 2016–17; and in the Mountain Valley Athletic Conference (MVAC) of the National Junior College Athletic Association (NJCAA) until after the 2014–15 school year.

SUNY Delhi competes in 17 intercollegiate varsity sports: Men's sports include basketball, cross country, golf, lacrosse, soccer, swimming & diving, tennis and track & field. Women's sports include basketball, cross country, golf, soccer, softball, swimming & diving, tennis, track & field and volleyball.

Accomplishments
The men's cross country earned the school's first four-year national title when they won the 2016 USCAA Championship, and repeated as champions in 2017. That same year, the men's golf team won the college's first national team title outside of cross country and track & field at the USCAA Championships.

History
Prior to 2015, the Broncos were members of the NJCAA, where they collected 21 national titles in men's and women's cross country and track & field.

Facilities
Kunsela Hall Aquatics Center, located in the agora on the main campus, houses the pool. This building went through renovations during the Fall 2011 semester and has since re-opened.

Clark Field house, located at the highest point on the main campus, has several features which contribute to Delhi's athletic success. Attached to this building, the "Bubble," is a dome which allows the space for indoor track and soccer practices, as well as mobile tennis nets and basketball hoops. Also in Clark Field house is the CADI Fitness Center, including traditional weight lifting options, recumbent bicycles, ellipticals, and treadmills, as well as equipment available for rent. The athletic offices are also located in this building, as well as the Floyd L. Maines Arena – often used for games, concerts, and other school functions.

There are a variety of outdoor spaces available as well, including a track, soccer field, racquetball courts, tennis courts, and basketball courts. The Delhi College Golf Course is located in the valley portion of the campus.

Farrell Student and Community Center has a dance and aerobics room on its main floor, where free yoga, pilates, and dance classes are regularly held.

Notable alumni
 Bill Pullman - actor
 Eric Weinrib - 2021 Alumnus of Merit award recipient, documentary filmmaker

References

External links
 Official website
 Official athletics website

 
Educational institutions established in 1913
Education in Delaware County, New York
1913 establishments in New York (state)
Public universities and colleges in New York (state)